Mozaic is a two-player abstract strategy board game in which players try to score points by placing colored glass gemstones onto a game board to form square patterns. The game was designed by Martin H. Samuel. Originally produced by Games Above Board, Sunnywood, Inc., of Hong Kong, then licensed the game and published it through Sterling Games in 2003.  Giseh Verlag launched the game in Germany at Essen Spiel in 2006.  An Axiom-powered electronic version of Mozaic was programmed for the PC platform by Greg Schmidt in 2010.

Gameplay
The Mozaic game board has 64 tiles (8 x 8 squares) with a score-keeping "ladder" on either end. Players decide which gem, either amber or cobalt gems, then they pick to construct their point-scoring squares. Players then take turns drawing gems from a bag, one at a time, and place them on any empty tile on the board. 4 points are scored when four same-color adjacent gems forming a square is completed. Existing squares may be built upon and expanded, and several point-scoring combinations may be completed at one time with a single gem. During the game, players keep score on their side of the board with an extra gem of their color. The game is over when the last gemstone is placed, all the tiles are covered, and only the four exception gems remain in the bag. The player with the most points wins the game.

In addition to the cobalt and amber gems, Mozaic also offers four "exception" gemstones that, when drawn, allow for certain actions:
Rubies cause the player to skip their turn.
Sapphires allow the player to slide any gem diagonally to an empty adjacent tile.
Onyx allow the player to take two turns.
Diamonds allow the player to remove any gem from the board and replace it in the bag.
Exception gemstones are always returned to the bag after a turn.

References

External links
 Games Above Board
 Mozaic at Boardgamegeek

Board games introduced in 2003